Orrville High School is a public high school in Orrville, Ohio. It is the only high school in the Orrville City School District. The school nickname is the Red Riders.

Orrville's football rivalry with the Wooster High School Generals is the oldest rivalry in Wayne County, having first met back in 1903. After the 2014 season, the teams had met 104 times. The Generals currently lead the series by a 52-42-9 margin.

Ohio High School Athletic Association State Championships

 Boys Football – 1998, 2018 
 Boys Basketball – 1992, 1995, 1996 
 Boys Track and Field – 1999 
 Girls Volleyball – 2003

Notable alumni and faculty
 Mike Birkbeck, former Major League pitcher
 Bob Knight, former NCAA Basketball coach, four-time NCAA National Champion, Team USA Olympic coach (1984 Gold Medal), eight-time Big Ten Coach of the Year, ESPN broadcaster, and Basketball Hall of Famer (class of 1991)
 Thom McDaniels, OHSAA Football Hall of Fame coach
 John R. Massaro, 8th Sergeant Major of the Marine Corps
 Joe Sedelmaier, director and producer of television commercials
 Mark Smucker, CEO of The J.M. Smucker Company (class of 1988)

References

External links
 District Website
 Orrville Football History Reference

High schools in Wayne County, Ohio
Public high schools in Ohio